Righini is an Italian surname. Notable people with the surname include:

Alberto Righini, Italian bobsledder
Pietro Righini (1683–1742), Italian architect
Vincenzo Righini, Italian composer

See also
9427 Righini, a main-belt asteroid

Italian-language surnames